Royal Prussian Jagdstaffel 60, commonly abbreviated to Jasta 60, was a "hunting group" (i.e., fighter squadron) of the Luftstreitkräfte, the air arm of the Imperial German Army during World War I. The squadron would score over 52 aerial victories during the war, including seven observation balloons downed. The unit's victories came at the expense of six pilots killed in action, three wounded in action, one injured in a flying accident, and two taken prisoner of war.

History
On 11 January 1918,  Jasta 60 was formed at the pilots and observers training school at Juterbog, Germany. The new squadron began operations on the 24th. On 8 March 1918, it scored its first aerial victory. On 29 July 1918, it was incorporated into Jagdgruppe 4 with 7 Armee. Jasta 60 would serve through war's end.

Commanding officers (Staffelführer)
 Freiherr von Rudno-Rudzinski: 11 January 1918 – May 1918 (MIA)
 Arno Benzler: 26 May 1918
 Fritz Höhn: September 1918 (during Benzler's home leave)

Duty stations
Unknown.

Notable personnel
 Arno Benzler
 Fritz Höhn
 Karl Ritscherle

References

Bibliography
 

60
Military units and formations established in 1918
1918 establishments in Germany
Military units and formations disestablished in 1918